Charoen Nakhon station is a Gold Line station, located in Khlong San District, Bangkok, Thailand. Officially Charoen Nakhon Station, it is also known as ICONSIAM station after the Iconsiam complex of which the station is located in front of. The station is on Charoen Nakhon Road and opened on 16 December 2020.

Station layout

Exits

 Exit 1: Iconsiam (ICS Building), Mitr Phol Business Administration Technology College, Soi Charoen Nakhon 2, Soi Charoen Nakhon 4
 Exit 2: Iconsiam (Bridge connecting through Charoen Nakhon Hall)
 Exit 3: Iconsiam (main building), Magnolias Waterfront Residences and The Residences at Mandarin Oriental, Bangkok, Millennium Hilton Bangkok Hotel, Soi Charoen Nakhon 3, Soi Charoen Nakhon 5

Bus connections
BMTA
3: Mo Chit 2–Khlong San
6: Phra Pradaeng–Bang Lamphu (operated by Thai Smile Bus Co., Ltd.)
84: Wat Rai Khing–BTS Krung Thon Buri
88: KMUTT Bang Khun Thian–Lat Ya
105: Maha Chai Mueang Mai–Khlong San
111: Charoen Nakhon–Talat Phlu
120: Samut Sakhon–Ban Khaek Intersection (operated by Thai Smile Bus Co., Ltd.)
149: Phuttamonthon Sai 2–Ekkamai (operated by Krungthep Rotruam Borikan Co., Ltd.)

References 

Bangkok rapid transit stations
Railway stations opened in 2020